Oakland Charter High School is a charter school in Oakland, California serving high school students. It was established in 2007. The school mascot is the matador. It is part of the Amethod Public Schools system and the Oakland Unified School District. In 2010–2011 the school had 121 students. The school has since had, for the 2019–2020 school year, 461 students.

The California Department of Education recognized the school as a Title I Academic Achievement Award School. Students scored a 961 on the Academic Performance Index in 2010 and 938 in 2011, results that exceeded those of other Oakland High Schools except American Indian Public High School and ranking among the top high schools in California.

The Oakland Charter High School campus has been moved from the downtown location to a new one where the Patten University campus is located for the 2017–18 school year.

References

2007 establishments in California
Charter high schools in California
Educational institutions established in 2007
High schools in Oakland, California
Oakland Unified School District